Accidental Death is a 1963 British drama directed by Geoffrey Nethercott and starring John Carson, Jacqueline Ellis, and Derrick Sherwin. It was made at Merton Park Studios as part of the long-running series of Edgar Wallace adaptations.

Plot
Henriette has a strained relationship with her guardian, Col. Johnnie Paxton, whose life was saved by Henriette's parents during the war. Upon returning from a party, Henriette and her boyfriend are surprised by an intruder. The intruder says he is here to kill the man who collaborated with the Nazis and caused the death of his fiancée.

Cast
John Carson as Paul Lanson
Jacqueline Ellis as Henriette
Derrick Sherwin as Alan
Richard Vernon as Johnnie Paxton
Jean Lodge as Brenda
Gerald Case as Police Inspector
Jacqueline Lacey as Milly
Rilla Madden as Nurse

References

External links
Accidental Death at BBFC
Accidental Death at BFI

1963 films
British crime films
1963 crime films
1960s English-language films
Films set in England
Merton Park Studios films
Edgar Wallace Mysteries
1960s British films